James Patterson Alexander (April 21, 1883 – January 1, 1948) was a justice of the Supreme Court of Texas from January 1941 to 1948, serving as chief justice from September 21, 1945 to January 1, 1948.

References

Justices of the Texas Supreme Court
1883 births
1948 deaths
20th-century American judges